Adam Alavdinovich Batirov (born 13 January 1985 in Dagestan) is a Russian and Bahraini freestyle wrestler of Avar heritage. He is a World Cadet Championships runner-up and Cadet European Champion (2002). He thrice won the Ivan Yarygin tournament and is National Russian Freestyle wrestling Champion (2007). In 2009, he won his first European Championships. At the 2016 Asian Wrestling Championships he won gold, beating Kumar Vinod of India in the final match. He is a 2018 World Championships runner-up.

Adam is the younger brother of two-time Olympic Champion Mavlet Batirov. After winning 2016 World Wrestling Olympic Qualification Tournament 1, he competed for Bahrain which led to its qualification for the 2016 Summer Olympics. There he lost in the first round to Ikhtiyor Navruzov from Uzbekistan.

At the World Championships 2018, he placed second, in the final match he lost to his countryman Magomedrasul Gazimagomedov by scores.

References

External links 
 
 
 

Avar people
Living people
1985 births
Russian male sport wrestlers
Naturalized citizens of Bahrain
Bahraini male sport wrestlers
Bahraini people of Avar descent
Bahraini people of Dagestani descent
People from Khasavyurt
Wrestlers at the 2016 Summer Olympics
Wrestlers at the 2018 Asian Games
Asian Games competitors for Bahrain
World Wrestling Championships medalists
European Wrestling Championships medalists
Islamic Solidarity Games medalists in wrestling
Sportspeople from Dagestan
20th-century Russian people
21st-century Russian people
21st-century Bahraini people